The No. 322 Squadron, being the oldest operational squadron of the Royal Netherlands Air Force, was founded at RAF Woodvale on 12 June 1943 as No. 322 (Dutch) Squadron with Dutch personnel under Royal Air Force control. At the end of the war 322e Jachtvliegtuig Afdeling of the Royal Netherlands Army was formed from the RAF squadron.

When it was equipped with the General Dynamics F-16 Fighting Falcon the squadron performed as the other Dutch F-16 Squadrons a dual 'swing role' task: ground support and, stationed on Leeuwarden Air Base, interceptor duties, especially above the North Sea. The squadron is currently equipped with the A-model of the Lockheed Martin F-35 Lightning II, its final F-16s having been withdrawn on July 1, 2021.

History
During the Battle of the Netherlands, many Dutch planes were destroyed by Nazi Germany's forces, but 350 German planes were shot down by the Dutch forces. After the battle, many pilots fled to the United Kingdom to continue the fight as part of the Allies. Then, on 12 June 1943, a separate squadron within the Royal Air Force was formed with Dutch pilots already flying in the RAF. That was the first official beginning of the No. 322 squadron. From then 322 Squadron also actively participated in the war and fought along the allied forces until the end of the war.

After the war, it was disbanded as a RAF squadron and formed part of the Dutch armed forces. There was no certain future for the squadron. It was deactivated and reactivated several times. It did serve in the Dutch East Indies and Netherlands New Guinea. The squadron was stationed at both Twente Air Base and Soesterberg Air Base. 
In 1964, the squadron was finally stationed at a permanent base, Leeuwarden Air Base, where it was permanently assigned with the air defense task.
Probably the most unusual mission in the squadron's history was performed on Saturday morning 11 June 1977 at 05:00 AM. With thundering afterburners, six of its fighter jets flew several very low passes over a hijacked train, initiating a successful operation that ended the 1977 Dutch train hostage crisis. 
Since the 1990s the squadron took part in several NATO and UN missions. During the Yugoslav Wars 322 Squadron made several deployments to Villafranca Air Base near Verona. From there it flew NATO missions over the former Yugoslavia. In 1995, during the fall of Srebrenica, two of its F-16s delivered the only bombs on the advancing Bosnian-Serb troops. The occasion marked the first attack by a female combat pilot in NATO, who scored a direct hit on a rolling Serbian tank using an (unguided) Mark 82 bomb. 
Since 2003, the squadron has seen action over Afghanistan.

Present
Together with Volkel Air Base, the 322 Squadron is on constant duty, ready for Quick Reaction Alert. Since 1964 when equipped with the F-104G Starfighter until today, the squadron is constantly practicing its tasks. Nowadays, the squadron has a swing-role task. These include air defense and ground support tasks, and the F-16 fighters can be reconfigured to handle new tasks anytime by changing their weapons loads. The squadron is constantly active and ready for deployment to crisis situations like Libya and Afghanistan. Because of financial cuts to the Ministry of Defense, the number of possessed F-16s has decreased to around 60 F-16 multi-role fighter jets. There are four squadrons with around 15 F-16s per squadron, including No. 322 Squadron. The main tasks are air defense and ground support roles, but other tasks are to:
 participate in strategic air operations
 perform middle-height bombing
 support own ground troops
 get and sustain air superiority
 maintain freedom of own armed forces
 contribute to air embargoes
 air reconnaissance

Deployments

Aircraft operated

Bibliography
Hellferich, Willem. Squadrons van de Koninklijke Luchtmacht. Second printing. 1994. .
Hellferich, Willem. 100 jaar Luchtmacht. De ontwikkeling van het luchtwapen bij de Koninklijke Luchtmacht van 1913 tot 2013. 2013. .
van den Heuvel, Coen. KLuNu 1991.
de Jong, Kolonel A.P. Vlucht door de tijd 75 jaar Nederlandse Luchtmacht. 1988.

References

External links
History of No. 322 Squadron 
Aviation Group Leeuwarden. 
Official site, Netherlands Ministry of Defence

322
Military units and formations established in 1943